The Roadster 521 is a 125cc motorcycle made by the Italian motorcycle firm, Cagiva in the 1990s.

One of the fastest accelerating 125cc motorcycles of its time, the Roadster 521 is known to have a top speed of 80 mph restricted and an estimated 100 mph+ un-restricted. Achieving approximately 70 miles per gallon, it is relatively economical for a 2-stroke motorcycle.

Specification 

Make Model

Cagiva Roadster 521

Number produced 329 between 1993 and 1999

Year
1993

Engine
Air cooled, Single cylinder, two stroke
Capacity

125
Bore x Stroke	56 x 50.6 mm

Compression Ratio	11.7:1
Induction

Ignition  /  Starting
Electronic CDI

Max Power
15.5 hp @ 7500 rpm

Max Torque
18 Nm @ 9000 rpm

Transmission  /  Drive
6 Speed  /  chain

Front Suspension
Hydraulic telescopic fork

Rear Suspension
Single-shock Soft-Damp

Front Brakes
Single 260mm disc

Rear Brakes
160mm drum

Front Tyre
3,25-19

Rear Tyre
140/90-15

Dry-Weight
125 kg

Fuel Capacity
11 Litres

Consumption  average
22.0 km/lit

Braking 60 - 0 / 100 - 0
13.3 m / 39.9 m

Standing ¼ Mile  
18.6 sec / 104.0 km/h

Roadster
Two-stroke motorcycles
Single-cylinder motorcycles
Standard motorcycles